The Lost Histories series is a series of novels set in the Dragonlance setting.

Contents
 The Kagonesti (A Story of the Wild Elves) (January 1995), by Douglas Niles,
 The Irda (Children of the Stars) (June 1995), by Linda P. Baker,
 The Dargonesti (October 1995), by Paul B. Thompson and Tonya C. Cook,
 Land of the Minotaurs (January 1996), by Richard A. Knaak,, Note: Continues the story of Kaz the Minotaur from The Legend of Huma, Kaz the Minotaur and the short story "Kaz and the Dragon's Children" from The Dragons of Krynn.
 The Gully Dwarves (June 1996), by Dan Parkinson,, Note: Continues the short story "The Promised Place" from The War of the Lance. The connected short stories "Off Day" and "Ogre Unaware" from The Reign of Istar and The Cataclysm respectively serve as an indirect prelude to The Promised Place and The Gully Dwarves.
 The Dragons (October 1996), by Douglas Niles,, Note: The short story "Aurora's Eggs" from The Dragons at War serves as a prequel to The Dragons.

References

Dragonlance novel series
Fantasy novel series